Adgaon Kh, is a small village in the Indian state of Maharashtra. Adgaon Kh village is 548898.  It is located in Aurangabad Tehsil of Aurangabad district, Maharashtra, India.

Geography
It is located 35 km away from sub-district headquarter Aurangabad. The total geographical area of Adgaon Kh is 1063.17 hectares. The village has a total population of 2,473.

See also
 List of villages in Akole taluka
 Aurangabad district, Maharashtra

References

Villages in Aurangabad district, Maharashtra
Aurangabad district, Maharashtra